Walter Emanuel Andrews (February 8, 1881 – March 1954) was an American-born Canadian cyclist. He competed in six events at the 1908 Summer Olympics. He won a bronze medal in the men's team pursuit.

References

External links
 
 
 

1881 births
1954 deaths
American emigrants to Canada
Canadian male cyclists
Olympic cyclists of Canada
Cyclists at the 1908 Summer Olympics
Olympic bronze medalists for Canada
Olympic medalists in cycling
Medalists at the 1908 Summer Olympics